ESC may refer to:

Education 
 Ecole Supérieure de Commerce, a type of French business school
 Edison State College, now Florida SouthWestern State College
 Empire State College of the State University of New York
 English Subject Centre, a British English-language educational organization
 Equatorial College School, a school in the Ibanda District of Uganda
 European School, Culham, in Oxfordshire, England
 European Solidarity Centre, a museum and library in Gdańsk, Poland
 European Solidarity Corps, volunteering program by the European Commission
 European Space Camp

Government and politics 
 Environmental Study Conference, U.S. House of Representatives 
 Economic and Social Council (Arab League)
 European Social Charter
 Essential Services Commission (Victoria)
 Essential Services Commission of South Australia

Science and engineering

Organizations 
 Electrical Safety Council, now Electrical Safety First, a British charity
 European Society of Cardiology
 European Society of Criminology

Computing 
 Esc key on a keyboard
 Escape character in the C0 control code set
 Escape sequence
 Extended static checking

Concepts and technologies 
 Einstein summation convention
 Electronic speed control
 Electronic stability control
 Embryonic stem cell
 Environmental stress cracking

Sports 
 Ekenäs Sport Club, a football club in Finland
 Empire Supporters Club, a fan club of the New York Red Bulls
 Equitable Stroke Control, in golf
 Essex Senior Cup, an English football competition
 Essex Skating Club, in New Jersey
 European Shooting Confederation

Other uses 
 Esc, Aesc or Oisc of Kent, King of Kent, 474–516 AD
 Delta County Airport, Escanaba, Michigan, by IATA code
 The Electric Swing Circus, a British band
 Electronic Systems Center, a former product center of the United States Air Force
 Energy Savings Certificate, a document certifying that a certain reduction of energy consumption has been obtained
 Eurovision Song Contest
 Expeditionary Sustainment Command
 Extreme Sports Channel, a television channel
 Guggenmos ESC, a German hang glider

See also